Elizabeth S. Radcliffe is Professor of philosophy at William & Mary. She is the author of Hume, Passion, and Action, which discusses David Hume's views on passion's role in driving our actions and constituting our moral judgments. Simon Blackburn calls it "a beautifully judged, balanced, and therefore especially valuable addition to the literature."

Radcliffe is editor of A Companion to Hume, and co-editor of Late Modern Philosophy: Essential Readings with Commentary. She was co-editor of the journal Hume Studies, with Kenneth Winkler, from 2000 to 2005, and president of the Hume Society from 2010 to 2012.

Before coming to William & Mary, Radcliffe was Professor of Philosophy at Santa Clara University. She has chaired each department. She received her MA and PhD from Cornell University in 1990. She has received two NEH Research Fellowships and an NEH Summer Stipend.

References 

Living people
College of William & Mary faculty
Santa Clara University faculty
American philosophy academics
Cornell University alumni
Hume scholars
Year of birth missing (living people)